Thomas Tennebø (born 19 March 1975) is a Norwegian football player.

While playing for Fana IL, he was sold to Hartlepool United in 1999, playing thirteen league games, three League Cup games and one Football League Trophy game over two seasons.

References

1975 births
Living people
Norwegian footballers
Fana IL players
Hartlepool United F.C. players
Løv-Ham Fotball players
Expatriate footballers in England
Footballers from Bergen
Norwegian expatriate footballers

Association football midfielders